Ivanovka is a rural locality (a selo) and the administrative center of Ivanovo-Nikolayvsky Selsoviet of Yenotayevsky District, Astrakhan Oblast, Russia. The population was 731 as of 2010. There are 5 streets.

Geography 
Ivanovka is located 7 km north of Yenotayevka (the district's administrative centre) by road. Nikolayevka is the nearest rural locality.

References 

Rural localities in Yenotayevsky District